Mohammad Dabir Moghaddam is an Iranian linguist and professor at Allameh Tabatabaee University and a permanent member of Academy of Persian Language and Literature. He was also the recipient of Iranian Science and Culture Hall of Fame award in 2010.

References 

1953 births
Linguists from Iran
Linguists of Iranian languages
Living people
Academic staff of Allameh Tabataba'i University
Iranian Science and Culture Hall of Fame recipients in Literature and Culture
Iran's Book of the Year Awards recipients
Faculty of Letters and Humanities of the University of Tehran alumni